Ruth Amiran (1914 – December 14, 2005), née Brandstetter, was an Israeli archaeologist whose book Ancient Pottery of the Holy Land: From Its Beginnings in the Neolithic Period to the End of the Iron Age which was published in 1970 is a standard reference for archaeologists working in Israel.

Ruth Amiran was born in the moshava Yavne'el in the Galilee area of the Ottoman Empire. In 1908 her father Yehezkel Brandshteter had immigrated from Tarnów in Poland (Galicia) to the area, where he married her mother Devora in 1913. She went to school in Haifa and became later in 1933 one of the first students of Archeology at the Hebrew University in Jerusalem. She excavated alongside Judith Marquet-Krause at et-Tell.

Awards 
Amiran received the Israel Prize in 1982.

Further reading

See also 
List of Israel Prize recipients

References 

1914 births
2005 deaths
Jewish Israeli writers
Hebrew University of Jerusalem alumni
Israel Prize women recipients
Israel Prize in Land of Israel studies recipients
Israeli people of German-Jewish descent
Israeli women scientists
Israeli women archaeologists
20th-century archaeologists
20th-century Israeli women writers